The Neal Smith National Wildlife Refuge is a federal national wildlife refuge located in Jasper County, Iowa, United States. The refuge, formerly known as Walnut Creek, is named after Congressman Neal Edward Smith, who championed its creation. It seeks to restore the tallgrass prairie and oak savanna ecosystems that once covered most of Iowa. It has a herd of approximately 50 American bison and 20 elk. An initial group of six bison were released in 1996.

The core of the Neal Smith refuge was a  block of land originally acquired by Iowa Power and Light) for a nuclear power plant. The U.S. Fish and Wildlife Service acquired this land in 1990. The Fish and Wildlife Service has acquired about  more of the allocated .

Although the Neal Smith refuge includes a patchwork of small and seriously degraded native prairies, most of the refuge is the result of prairie restoration or reconstruction efforts. The restoration work has been done with local ecotype seed harvested from nearby native prairie remnants or from other restoration efforts that have used acceptable local ecotype seed.

Prairie Learning Center
Located near Prairie City, Iowa, the Prairie Learning Center features exhibits and movies about the tallgrass prairie, sedge meadow and oak savanna ecosystems of the Neal Smith National Wildlife Refuge.  The Center offers environmental education programs for school groups, scout groups and more.  The Friends of the Prairie Learning Center operate the Prairie Point book store, which sells nature-themed books and gifts.

See also
Midewin National Tallgrass Prairie

References

External links
U.S. Fish & Wildlife Service, Neal Smith National Wildlife Refuge
Friends of Neal Smith National Wildlife Refuge

Protected areas of Jasper County, Iowa
Grasslands of the North American Great Plains
National Grasslands of the United States
National Wildlife Refuges in Iowa
Grasslands of Iowa
Protected areas established in 1990
1990 establishments in Iowa